Vaux or Vaux-en-Couhé is a former commune in the Vienne department in the Nouvelle-Aquitaine region in western France. On 1 January 2019, it was merged into the new commune Valence-en-Poitou.

Its inhabitants are called the Valois and Valoises. It covered 25.8 km2 and had 785 inhabitants in 2019. 
Surrounded by the communes of Chatillon, Romagna and Ceaux-en-Couhé, Vaux is located 33 km southwest of Poitiers, the largest city nearby.

References

External links
http://www.annuaire-mairie.fr/mairie-vaux-86.html

Former communes of Vienne